The old pal is a cocktail originally made with rye whiskey, French vermouth (dry), and Campari. It is similar to a Negroni, but with rye whiskey instead of gin and dry vermouth instead of sweet.

Harry MacElhone, the proprietor of Harry's New York Bar in Paris, France, is recognized as the first to publish the cocktail's recipe. MacElhone named this cocktail after William "Sparrow" Robinson, a sports editor for The New York Herald in Paris. This three-ingredient cocktail is essentially a drier version of the boulevardier, which was also invented by MacElhone.

References

Cocktails with Campari
Cocktails with vermouth
Cocktails with rye whisky